This is a list of awards received by English artist George Harrison. Harrison has won awards both as a recording artist and for his work in film. Additional honors are posted at Legacy.

Academy Awards

|-
| 1971 || Let It Be  || Best Original or Adaptation Score ||

Billboard

|-
|style="text-align:center;"| 1992
|George Harrison
|Billboard Century Award
|

British Independent Film Awards

|-
|style="text-align:center;"| 2002
|George Harrison
|Lifetime Achievement Award
|

Evening Standard British Film Awards

|-
|style="text-align:center;"| 1986
|George Harrison
|Special Award
|

Ivor Novello Awards

|-
|style="text-align:center;"| 1969
|"Something"
|Best Song Musically and Lyrically
|

Hollywood Chamber of Commerce

|-
|style="text-align:center;"| 2009
|George Harrison
|Hollywood Walk of Fame Star
|

Grammy Awards

|-
| rowspan="4" | 1965 || The Beatles || Best New Artist || 
|-
| "I Want to Hold Your Hand" || Record of the Year || 
|-
| rowspan="2" | A Hard Day's Night || Best Performance by a Vocal Group || 
|-
| Best Rock & Roll Recording || 
|-
| rowspan="4" | 1966 || rowspan="4" | Help! || Album of the Year || 
|-
| Best Performance by a Vocal Group Performance || 
|-
| Best Contemporary (R&R) Performance – Group (Vocal or Instrumental) || 
|-
| Best Original Score Written for a Motion Picture or Television Show || 
|-
| rowspan="1" | 1967 || Revolver || Album of the Year || 
|-
| rowspan="5" | 1968 || rowspan="4" | Sgt. Pepper's Lonely Hearts Club Band || Album of the Year || 
|-
| Best Contemporary Album || 
|-
| Best Performance by a Vocal Group || 
|-
| Best Contemporary Group Performance (Vocal or Instrumental) || 
|-
| "A Day in the Life" || Best Instrumental Arrangement Accompanying Vocalist(s)/Best Background Arrangement || 
|-
| rowspan="3" | 1969 || Magical Mystery Tour || Album of the Year || 
|-
| rowspan="2" | "Hey Jude" || Record of the Year || 
|-
| Best Contemporary Pop Performance – Vocal, Duo or Group || 
|-
| rowspan="3" | 1970 || rowspan="2" | Abbey Road || Album of the Year || 
|-
| Best Contemporary Vocal Performance by a Group || 
|-
| Yellow Submarine || Best Original Score Written for a Motion Picture or a Television Special || 
|-
| rowspan="3" | 1971 || rowspan="1" | "Let It Be" || Record of the Year || 
|-
| rowspan="2" | Let It Be || Best Contemporary Vocal Performance by a Duo, Group or Chorus || 
|-
| Best Original Score Written for a Motion Picture or a Television Special || 
|-
|rowspan="2" style="text-align:center;"| 1972
|All Things Must Pass
|Album of the Year
|
|-
|"My Sweet Lord"
|Record of the Year
|
|-
|style="text-align:center;"| 1973
|The Concert for Bangladesh
|Album of the Year
|
|-
| rowspan="1" | 1989 || rowspan="1" | "When We Was Fab" || Best Concept Music Video || 
|-
| rowspan="2" | 1990 || rowspan="2" | Traveling Wilburys Vol. 1 || Best Rock Performance by a Duo or Group with Vocal || 
|-
| Album of the Year || 
|-
| rowspan="1" | 1994 || rowspan="1" | "My Back Pages" || Best Rock Performance by a Duo or Group with Vocal || 
|-
| rowspan="1" | 1996 || rowspan="1" | "Live at the BBC" || Best Historical Album || 
|-
| rowspan="3" | 1997 || rowspan="2" | "Free as a Bird" || Best Pop Performance by a Duo or Group with Vocal || 
|-
| Best Music Video, Short Form || 
|-
| rowspan="1" | The Beatles Anthology || Best Music Video, Long Form || 
|-
|rowspan="3" style="text-align:center;"| 2004
|Brainwashed
|Best Pop Vocal Album
|
|-
|"Marwa Blues"
|Best Pop Instrumental Performance
|
|-
|"Any Road"
|Best Male Pop Vocal Performance
|
|-
|style="text-align:center;"| 2014
|All Things Must Pass
|Grammy Hall of Fame
|
|-
|style="text-align:center;"| 2015
|George Harrison
|Lifetime Achievement Award
|
|-
|style="text-align:center;"| 2022
|All Things Must Pass: 50th Anniversary
|Best Boxed or Special Limited Edition Package
|
|-

MTV Music Video Awards

|-
|rowspan="8" style="text-align:center;"| 1988
|"When We Was Fab"
|Video of the Year
|
|-
|"Got My Mind Set on You"
|Best Male Video
|
|-
|"When We Was Fab"
|Best Concept Video
|
|-
|"When We Was Fab"
|Breakthrough Video
|
|-
|"When We Was Fab"
|Best Special Effects in a Video
|
|-
|"Got My Mind Set on You"
|Best Special Effects in a Video
|
|-
|"When We Was Fab"
|Best Art Direction in A Video
|
|-
|"When We Was Fab"
|Viewer's Choice
|
|-

NME awards
{| class="wikitable sortable"  style="font-size:95%; width:50%;"
|-
!Year
!Award
!Recipient 
!Result
|-
|rowspan="3"|1963
| World Vocal Group 
| The Beatles
|
|- 
| British Vocal Group 
| The Beatles
|
|-
|Best British Disc Of The Year – ‘She Loves You’ 
| The Beatles
|
|-
|rowspan="2"|1964
|Outstanding Vocal Group 
| The Beatles
|
|-
|British Vocal Group 
| The Beatles
|
|-
|rowspan="2"|1965
|British Vocal Group  
| The Beatles
|
|-
|World Vocal Group  
| The Beatles
|
|-
|rowspan="2"|1966
|British Vocal Group   
| The Beatles
|
|-
|Best British Disc This Year – ‘Eleanor Rigby’ 
| The Beatles
|
|-
|rowspan="3"|1968
|World Vocal Group    
| The Beatles
|
|-
|British Vocal Group    
| The Beatles
|
|-
|Best British Disc This Year – ‘Hey Jude’   
| The Beatles
|
|-
|rowspan="2"|1970
|Top British Group   
| The Beatles
|
|-
|1970's Best British LP – ’Let It Be’    
| The Beatles
|
|-
|rowspan="2"|1971
|Top British Group     
| The Beatles
|
|-
|Best British LP – ‘Let It Be’     
| The Beatles
|

Raindance Film Festival

|-
|style="text-align:center;"| 2002
|George Harrison
|Lifetime Achievement Award
|

Rock And Roll Hall of Fame

|-
|style="text-align:center;"| 2004
|George Harrison
|Performer
|

Sources
George Harrison
George Harrison

See also
List of awards and nominations received by the Beatles

Harrison, George
Awards